This is a list of the Carolina Panthers' NFL Draft selections:

Key

Selections by year

1995 NFL Draft

1996 NFL Draft

1997 NFL Draft

1998 NFL Draft

1999 NFL Draft

2000 NFL Draft

2001 NFL Draft

2002 NFL Draft

2003 NFL Draft

2004 NFL Draft

2005 NFL Draft

2006 NFL Draft

2007 NFL Draft

2008 NFL Draft

2009 NFL Draft

2010 NFL Draft

2011 NFL Draft

2012 NFL Draft

2013 NFL Draft

2014 NFL Draft

2015 NFL Draft

2016 NFL Draft

2017 NFL Draft

2018 NFL Draft

2019 NFL Draft

2020 NFL Draft

2021 NFL Draft

2022 NFL Draft

External links
Carolina Panthers College Draft History

Draft history